The Grojanowski Report is an eye-witness account about atrocities in the Nazi Chełmno extermination camp, written in 1942 by Polish-Jewish escapee from the camp, Szlama Ber Winer (also known incorrectly as Szlawek Bajler), under the pseudonym of Yakov (or Jacob) Grojanowski. Szlama Ber Winer managed to make his way from Chelmno to the Warsaw Ghetto and gave detailed information about his week-long experience with the Sonderkommando at that death camp to the Ghetto's Oneg Shabbat group, headed by historian Emanuel Ringelblum.

Report contents
Winer described the entire extermination procedure at the camp, how people were murdered in gas vans, how their corpses were removed by the forest commando, how the inside of the vans was cleaned between loads, and how the bodies were buried in large mass graves. Winer wrote:

Winer also described the brutal treatment of  Sonderkommando prisoners, left alive to dispose of the corpses, and his escape from the camp. Oneg Shabbat group and Winer then copied the report in both Polish and German; they sent the Polish version to the Polish Underground State, while the German copy was meant for the German people, in the hope it would evoke their compassion for the Jews. It is unclear what was done with the reports at that point.

Winer subsequently escaped to Zamość where he wrote to the Warsaw Ghetto of the existence of a death camp in Bełżec.  A few days after writing this letter, towards the end of April 1942, he was rounded up, deported and gassed at Bełżec. Another escaped inmate from Chelmno, Mordechaï Podchlebnik, managed to survive the war, and in 1961 gave testimony at the Eichmann trial in Jerusalem.

References

See also
Jan Karski
Witold Pilecki

Holocaust historical documents
Chełmno extermination camp
1942 documents